Tamora Pierce (born December 13, 1954) is an American writer of fantasy fiction for teenagers, known best for stories featuring young heroines. She made a name for herself with her first book series, The Song of the Lioness (1983–1988), which followed the main character Alanna through the trials and triumphs of training as a knight.

Pierce won the Margaret A. Edwards Award from the Young Adult Library Services Association (YALSA) of the American Library Association in 2013, citing her two quartets Song of the Lioness and Protector of the Small (1999–2002). The annual award recognizes one writer and a particular body of work for "significant and lasting contribution to young adult literature".

Pierce's books have been translated into twenty languages.

Early life and education
Pierce was born in South Connellsville, Pennsylvania in Fayette County, on December 13, 1954. Her mother wanted to name her "Tamara" but the nurse who filled out her birth certificate misspelled it as "Tamora". When she was five, her sister Kimberly (on whom she based Alanna) was born and a year later her second sister, Melanie, was born. From the time she was five until she was eight, she lived in Dunbar. In June 1963 she and her family moved to California. They first lived in San Mateo on El Camino Real and then moved to the other side of the San Francisco Peninsula, in Miramar. They lived in Miramar for half a year, in El Granada a full year, and then three years in Burlingame.

She began reading when she was very young and started writing when she was in the sixth grade. Her interest in fantasy and science fiction began when she was introduced to J. R. R. Tolkien's The Lord of the Rings, and so she started to write the kind of books that she was reading. After her parents divorced, her mother moved her and her sisters back to Fayette County in 1969, where she spent two years at Albert Gallatin Senior High. When her family moved again, she spent her senior year at Uniontown Area Senior High School, acting, singing, and writing for the school paper. She is an alumna of the University of Pennsylvania in Philadelphia.

Career
While at the University of Pennsylvania, Pierce wrote the books that became The Song of the Lioness quartet. The first book of this quartet, Alanna: The First Adventure was published by Atheneum Books in 1983.

Pierce lived with her husband Tim Liebe (Spouse-Creature) in New York City, with their four cats and multiple other pets, until they moved to Syracuse, New York.

In 2008, she donated her archive to the department of Rare Books and Special Collections at Northern Illinois University.

Pierce was also actively involved in moderating and discussing her novels on a message board called Sheroes Central from about 2001-2006, at which point it was acquired by a third party.

Writing process
On her homepage, Pierce states she gets most ideas from things she stumbles upon. Her concept of magic as a tapestry of threads comes from her experiences in crocheting, and in her world, all mages are somehow based on British naturalist David Attenborough after watching his nature documentaries. Fantasy novels and Arthurian legend were the base of the worlds she thought up as a girl, and later she added contemporary issues like youth crime and cholera outbreaks in Africa. In general, Pierce states: "The best way to prepare to have ideas when you need them is to listen to and encourage your obsessions."

Pierce draws on elements of people and animals around her for inspiration. The character of Alanna is loosely based on Pierce's sister. Thayet's appearance is based on a friend of Pierce's. Beka's pigeon friends in Provost's Dog are all based on actual pigeons of Pierce's acquaintance.

Pierce first started writing to escape from the drama of her parents' divorce. She wrote fan fiction based on her favorite stories, imitating them closely. Pierce says she decided to write her stories about strong female characters because she noticed a lack of them in the books she read when she was young.

Awards and nominations

Accolades

Works

See also

References

Other sources
"Podcast Interview about 'White Tiger' with Tamora Pierce and Timothy Liebe" 
"Tiger Tiger Burning Bright: Pierce Talks 'White Tiger'"  by David Richards, Comic Book Resources, March 6, 2006
"Eye of the White Tiger: Meet Marvel's Tamora Pierce" by Newsarama, February 27, 2006

Cart, Michael, From Romance to Realism: 50 Years of Growth and Change in Young Adult Literature (New York: HarperCollins, 1996) 

Egoff, Sheila A., Worlds Within: Children’s Fantasy from the Middle Ages to Today (Chicago & London: American Library Association, 1988) 
Melano, Anne L., "Utopias of Violence: Pierce's Knights of Tortall and the Contemporary Heroic"  (Crossroads: An Interdisciplinary Journal for the Study of History, Philosophy, Religion and Classics, vol 3 issue 2, 2009)
Lennard, John, Tamora Pierce: The Immortals (Tirril: Humanities-Ebooks, 2007) 
 -- 'Of Stormwings and Valiant Women: The Tortallan World of Tamora Pierce', in Of Modern Dragons and other essays on Genre Fiction (Tirril: Humanities-Ebooks, 2007), pp. 191–228 
Sullivan III, C. W., ed., Young Adult Science Fiction (Westport, CT: Greenwood Press, 1999 Contributions to the Study of Science Fiction and Fantasy 79) 
Trites, Roberta Seelinger, Disturbing the Universe: Power and Repression in Adolescent Literature (Iowa City: University of Iowa Press, 2000)

External links

 Official Website
 
  (ISFDB)
 
 Publisher: Science Fiction Book Club (SFBC) at ISFDB
 Publisher Page
 Goodreads
 Amazon
 Facebook
 Twitter
 Tumblr

1953 births
American children's writers
American comics writers
American fantasy writers
American women novelists
Audiobook narrators
Female comics writers
Margaret A. Edwards Award winners
People from Burlingame, California
People from Fayette County, Pennsylvania
Women science fiction and fantasy writers
Writers from the San Francisco Bay Area
Living people
20th-century American novelists
21st-century American novelists
20th-century American women writers
21st-century American women writers
American women children's writers
Women writers of young adult literature
Novelists from California
Novelists from Pennsylvania